Shushud (also Romanized as Shūshūd; also known as Shūshūd-e Bālā) is a village in Fasharud Rural District of the Central District of Birjand County, South Khorasan province, Iran. At the 2006 National Census, its population was 615 in 170 households. The following census in 2011 counted 450 people in 141 households. The latest census in 2016 showed a population of 460 people in 141 households; it was the largest village in its rural district.

References 

Birjand County

Populated places in South Khorasan Province

Populated places in Birjand County